Down by the Sea is a 1956 novel by the British writer Walter Greenwood. It is the final entry of a trilogy set in the fictional fishing port of Treeloe in Cornwall. Durrall, the principal protagonist of the previous novel marries a woman and is able to prosper by opening his cottage as a tea house for tourists.

It was his penultimate published novel, followed by the Manchester-set Saturday Night at the Crown in 1959.

References

Bibliography
 Hopkins, Chris. Walter Greenwood's Love on the Dole: Novel, Play, Film. Oxford University Press, 2018.
 Woods, Tim. Who's Who of Twentieth Century Novelists. Routledge, 2008.

1956 British novels
Novels by Walter Greenwood
Novels set in Cornwall
Hutchinson (publisher) books